The 2008–09 Standard Bank Pro20 was the sixth running of Standard Bank Pro20 Series. It saw the Cape Cobras win their first title having previously lost in two finals. For the first time in the competition's history the semi-finals were best of three contests, both semis went to the third match and both were tied, the finalists were decided by a super over tie breaker. The series began on 21 January 2009 and finished with the final on 21 February 2009.

Teams
Cape Cobras in Cape Town and Paarl
Dolphins in Durban and Pietermaritzburg
Diamond Eagles in Bloemfontein and Kimberley
Highveld Lions in Johannesburg and Potchefstroom
Titans in Centurion, Gauteng and Benoni
Warriors in East London and Port Elizabeth

Stadiums

Standings

Point system
Win, with bonus point: 5 Points
Win, without bonus point: 4 Points
Tie: 2 points
No Result: 2 Points
Loss: 0 points
The team that achieves a run rate of 1.25 times that of the opposition shall be rewarded one bonus point.
A team's run rate will be calculated by reference to the runs scored in an innings divided by the number of overs faced.

Fixtures

Group stage

Knockout stage

Semi-finals

Warriors vs. Diamond Eagles

Dolphins vs. Cape Cobras

Final

Statistics

Most runs

Average

Most wickets

Bowling average

References

External links
CricketArchive
Cricinfo
Supersport
Twenty20

South African domestic cricket competitions
Standard Bank Pro20
2008–09 South African cricket season